James the Cat is a 1984 British children's series created by Kate Canning and produced by Jan Clayton with Grampian Television. It chronicles the many events which take place at the Cornerhouse (number 104) between James and his new animal friends. Fellow characters include Mrs. Lavender, a snail; Frieda, a kangaroo; Citroen, a French frog; Rocky, a dimwitted rabbit; and Dennis, a pink fire-breathing Welsh-accented Chinese dragon. There is also a beehive in the garden at the Cornerhouse. Next door are Ma and Pa Rat, and their rat children.

Description
The program changes quite a bit between the 2 series. In the first, James is a newcomer to the garden at the Cornerhouse, and must learn to live with the other animals there. In the first episode of the second series, James becomes a diplomat (though sometimes he is referred to as a VIP). In subsequent episodes, he and the others travel to distant lands or receive important visitors.

The show was revived in 1998 for Milkshake!

VHS
There were two VHS tapes released by Tempo Video.

Screen Entertainment also released one VHS tape.

External links
The Canning Factory
James the Cat at Toonhound
James the Cat at ClassicKidsTV

1980s British children's television series
1990s British children's television series
1984 British television series debuts
1998 British television series endings
1980s British animated television series
1990s British animated television series
British children's animated adventure television series
British children's animated fantasy television series
Animated television series about cats
ITV children's television shows
Scottish television shows
English-language television shows
Children's television characters
Television series by Mattel Creations
Television shows produced by Grampian Television